Dodo is a given name and a surname. It may refer to:

Given name:
 Dodo Bin Khafef Soomro III, ruler of Sindh
 Dodo zu Innhausen und Knyphausen (1583–1636), Field Marshal of Sweden
 Dodo von Knyphausen (1641–1698), official of Brandenburg-Prussia
 Dodo, Prince Yu (1614–1649), Manchu prince and general
 Dodo Kuranosuke (died 1560), Japanese samurai
 Dodo Chichinadze (1924–2009), Georgian film and theater actress
 Dodo Maheri, Pakistani politician

Surname:
 Asako Dodo (born 1967), Japanese voice actress
 Mor Dodo (died 609), Syriac Orthodox bishop
 Shunji Dodo (born 1947), Japanese photographer